Whitechapel is a shopping street in Liverpool, Merseyside in the Central Retail Area. It lies north of Paradise Street, Church Street and Lord Street.

Shops on Whitechapel include the city's flagship Forever 21 and the Metquarter shopping centre which houses many high-end boutiques.

References

Shopping streets in Liverpool